Provincial Trunk Highway 67 (PTH 67) is a short provincial highway in the Canadian province of Manitoba. It runs as an east-west route just north of Winnipeg city limits between PTH 6 near the village of Warren to PTH 9 at the gate to Lower Fort Garry.

PTH 67 is the main highway through the town of Stonewall.  The speed limit is 100 km/h (60 mph).

History
PTH 67 first appeared on the 1963 Manitoba Highway Map. Originally, it was a very short connector highway spanning  through Stonewall between PTH 6 and PTH 7. Between PTH 7 and PTH 9, the highway was known as PR 223 after the provincial government implemented it Secondary Highway system in 1966.

PTH 67 was extended on to PR 223 (which was decommissioned in its entirety) in 1983.

Major intersections

References

067